Asteranthera is a monotypic plant genus in the family Gesneriaceae, native to the humid forests of Argentina and Chile. The sole species in the genus, Asteranthera ovata, is an evergreen scrambling vine. The plant has small rounded leaves with scalloped margins. The flowers are tubular and two-lipped, red with white markings. It blooms in the summer and can be grown as a climber or ground cover.

References

Lord, Tony (2003) Flora: The Gardener's Bible : More than 20,000 garden plants from around the world. London: Cassell. 

Gesnerioideae
Gesneriaceae genera
Flora of the Valdivian temperate rainforest
Monotypic Lamiales genera